Paul-Heinrich Dähne (7 July 1921 – 24 April 1945) was a German Luftwaffe military aviator during World War II, a fighter ace credited with 100 aerial victories—that is, 100 aerial combat encounters resulting in the destruction of the enemy aircraft—claimed in about 600 combat missions.

Born in Frankfurt an der Oder, Dähne was trained as a fighter pilot and was posted to Jagdgeschwader 52 (JG 52—52nd Fighter Wing) in late 1940. Fighting on the English Channel, he claimed his first aerial victory on 26 August 1941 over an Royal Air Force (RAF) Bristol Blenheim bomber. His unit was then posted to the Eastern Front where his number of aerial victories increased to 90. Dähne was awarded the Knight's Cross of the Iron Cross on 6 April 1944. He was then transferred to the Western Front where he fought in Defense of the Reich. There he was appointed Gruppenkommandeur (group commander) of III. Gruppe (3rd group) of Jagdgeschwader 11 (JG 11—11th Fighter Wing) and later of II. Gruppe of JG 11. Dähne was killed in a flight accident while training on the Heinkel He 162 jet fighter near Warnemünde, Germany on 24 April 1945.

Career
Dähne was 7 July 1921 in Frankfurt an der Oder, at the time in the Province of Brandenburg in the German Empire. Following flight training as a fighter pilot, he was posted to the 2. Staffel (2nd squadron) of Jagdgeschwader 52 (JG 52—52nd Fighter Wing), a squadron of I. Gruppe (1st group) of JG 52, in late 1940. At the time, 2. Staffel was commanded by Oberleutnant Karl-Heinz Leesmann and I. Gruppe was led by Hauptmann Wolfgang Ewald. Dähne was nicknamed "Sarotti", referring to the German chocolate brand Sarotti, by his comrades for his dark taint and his love of chocolate. He had joined the Gruppe following its withdrawal from the English Channel while it was based at Krefeld Airfield for a period of rest and replenishment. On 26 December, I. Gruppe relocated to an airfield at Katwijk where it was tasked with patrolling the Dutch coast area and German Bight. On 21 February 1941, the three Staffeln were deployed at various airfields on the Dutch, German and Danish North Sea coast.

On 24 May, Ewald was transferred and in consequence Leesmann was given command I. Gruppe while Oberleutnant Robert Göbel then headed 2. Staffel. On 7 July, 2. Staffel moved to Langeoog, staying on the island until 31 August. While based at Langeoog, Dähne claimed his first aerial victory on 26 August when he shot down a Royal Air Force (RAF) Bristol Blenheim bomber north of Juist.

War against the Soviet Union
On 22 June, German forces had launched Operation Barbarossa, the invasion of the Soviet Union. Pror to its deployment on the Eastern Front, I. Gruppe was fully equipped with the Messerschmitt Bf 109 F-2. The Gruppe reached Orsha on 27 September before heading to Ponyatovka on 2 October. There, the Gruppe was initially subordinated to the Stab (headquarters unit) of Jagdgeschwader 27 (JG 27—27th Fighter Wing) and supported German forces fighting in the Battle of Vyazma  as part of Operation Typhoon, the code name of the German offensive on Moscow. Here, Dähne claimed his first aerial victory on the Eastern Front on 18 October when he shot down an Ilyushin DB-3 bomber. Here, Dähne claimed a Polikarpov R-5 reconnaissance bomber on 18 November. The failed assault on Moscow forced I. Gruppe to retreat to an airfield at Dugino, present-day Novodugino, on 15 December where they stayed until 31 January 1942. Here on 20 January, he claimed two I-61 fighters, an early German designation for the Mikoyan-Gurevich MiG-3.

On 1 February 1942, I. Gruppe was withdrawn from combat operations and was moved to Smolensk and then further west to Orsha. From 8 to 12 February the Gruppe took a train to Jesau near Königsberg, present-day Kaliningrad in Russia, for a period of recuperation and replenishment where they received new Bf 109 F-4 aircraft. The Gruppe was ordered to Olmütz, present-day Olomouc in Czech Republic on 11 April. On 17 May, I. Gruppe relocated to Artyomovsk, present-day Bakhmut. From Artyomovsk, JG 52 supported the German forces fighting in the Second Battle of Kharkov. On 1 June, the Gruppe then moved to an airfield at Grakowo, located approximately halfway between Kharkov and Kupiansk.

In June 1942, command positions in I. Gruppe changed. On 13 June, Leesmann was transferred passing command of the Gruppe to Hauptmann Helmut Bennemann. When Göbel, the commander of 2. Staffel, was killed in action on 25 June, command was briefly given to Leutnant Karl Rung until Hauptmann Johannes Wiese took command two days later.

When on 10 May 1943, Bennemann was severely wounded by the explosion of an incendiary bomb at Charkow-Woitschenko Airfield, Wiese was tasked with leading I. Gruppe. At first, Wiese commanded both 2. Staffel and I. Gruppe until on 1 July, Dähne was given temporary leadership of the Staffel.

Three days later, an aerial victory claimed by Dähne was counted as 800th aerial victory by I. Gruppe and the 6,000th of JG 52 overall. By 5 October, the injuries sustained by Bennemann on 10 May proved so severe that Wiese was officially given command of the Gruppe. Dähne was officially appointed Staffelkapitän (squadron leader) of 2. Staffel of JG 52 on 13 November 1943. On 6 April 1944, Dähne was awarded the Knight's Cross of the Iron Cross.

Defense of the Reich
In early June 1944, 2. Staffel was withdrawn from the Eastern Front and transferred west to fight in Defense of the Reich. The Staffel was subordinated to III. Gruppe of Jagdgeschwader 11 (JG 11—11th Fighter Wing) led by Hauptmann Horst-Günther von Fassong. There, the Staffel was then redesignated and became the 12. Staffel of JG 11. When on 22 June Soviet forces launched Operation Bagration, III. Gruppe was ordered to relocate to the Eastern Front where it was to be deployed in the combat area of Minsk and fought in the Minsk Offensive. The Gruppe flew its last combat missions on the Eastern Front on 1 September. During its ten-week tenure in the east, III. Gruppe pilots claimed approximately 125 aerial victories, including six by Dähne, for the loss of twelve pilots killed or missing and further eleven injured or wounded in combat. The Gruppe then moved to an airfield at Riesa-Leutewitz for a brief period of rest and replenishment.

On 17 September 1944 Allied forces launched Operation Market Garden, the operation to cross the Rhine at Arnhem. The following day, III. Gruppe was ordered to Achmer Airfiled to support the German defense. On 25 September, during Operation Berlin, the evacuation of the remnants of the British 1st Airborne Division, Dähne claimed a Republic P-47 Thunderbolt fighter shot down. Two days later, III. Gruppe flew a combat air patrol to the area of Arnhem-Nijmegen area where Dähne claimed an aerial victory over a Supermarine Spitfire fighter.

In preparation for Operation Bodenplatte, III. Gruppe was moved to an airfield at Großostheim, near Aschaffenburg on 17 December 1944. Fassong had learned of the planned operation on 5 December at a meeting held at the headquarters of the II. Jagdkorps (2nd Fighter Corps) commanded by Generalmajor Dietrich Peltz, on 5 December. Fassong informed his Staffelkapitäne of the upcoming operation on 15 December without going into the specifics of the target and date. On 24 December, during the Battle of the Bulge, Dähne shot down a Lockheed P-38 Lightning of the Ninth Air Force near Trier.

Operation Bodenplatte was launched on 1 January. At 06:30, Fassong briefed his pilots of the operation and that their target would be the Asch Airfield (Designated: Y-29) located north-west of Maastricht. At 08:18, Fassong led a flight of 31 Focke Wulf Fw 190 A-8 fighter aircraft to Frankfurt where they were joined by other Luftwaffe fighters. On this mission, Fassong was killed in action and Dähne was shot down in his Fw 190 and bailed out over German held territory. In consequence, Dähne succeeded Fassong as Gruppenkommandeur (group commander) of III. Gruppe while Leutnant Günter Metzner was given command of 12. Staffel.

In March 1945, Dähne succeeded Oberleutnant Fritz Wegener as commander of II. Gruppe of Jagdgeschwader 1 "Oesau" (JG 1—1st Fighter Wing). Wegener had temporarily led the Gruppe after its former commander, Hauptmann Hermann Staiger, was transferred in January. The Gruppe was based at Garz Airfield located near Garz. On 26 March, Dähne received orders to relocate II. Gruppe to Wien-Schwechat Airfield for conversion training to the Heinkel He 162 jet fighter. The order was later changed and II. Gruppe was ordered to Rostock-Marienehe for conversion training. Dähne was killed in a training flight accident of the He 162 near Warnemünde, Germany on 24 April 1945 shortly after 16:00. Flying at an altitude of  Dähne had attempted a turn when his aircraft began skidding. The aircraft lost height rapidly and crashed into the Warnow. It was assumed that Dähne had deployed the ejection seat while the aircraft canopy failed to release, smashing his skull.

Summary of career

Aerial victory claims
According to US historian David T. Zabecki, Dähne was credited with 100 aerial victories. Spick lists him with approximately 100 aerial victories claimed in about 600 combat missions, with 80 claims on the Eastern Front and 20 on the Western Front. Mathews and Foreman, authors of Luftwaffe Aces — Biographies and Victory Claims, researched the German Federal Archives and indicate that Dähne had more than 99 aerial victory claims. This figure includes at least 97 aerial victories on the Eastern Front and two over the Western Allies. According to the authors, the actual number of aerial victories may be as high as 128 claims.

Victory claims were logged to a map-reference (PQ = Planquadrat), for example "PQ 4758". These sectors were then subdivided into 36 smaller units to give a location area 3 × 4 km in size.

Awards
 Honour Goblet of the Luftwaffe on 13 September 1943 as Oberleutnant and pilot
 German Cross in Gold on 17 October 1943 as Oberleutnant in the 2./Jagdgeschwader 52
 Knight's Cross of the Iron Cross on 6 April 1944 as Oberleutnant and Staffelkapitän of the 12./Jagdgeschwader 11 (previously 2./Jagdgeschwader 52)

Notes

References

Citations

Bibliography

 
 
 
 
 
 
 
 
 
 
 
 
 
 
 
 
 
 
 
 
 
 
 
 
 
 

1921 births
1945 deaths
People from Frankfurt (Oder)
German World War II flying aces
Recipients of the Gold German Cross
Recipients of the Knight's Cross of the Iron Cross
Luftwaffe personnel killed in World War II
Aviators killed in aviation accidents or incidents in Germany
People from the Province of Brandenburg
Victims of aviation accidents or incidents in 1945
Military personnel from Brandenburg